Women have contested events at the World Athletics Championships since its inauguration in 1983. The top three athletes in each event win gold, silver and bronze medals, respectively. A one-off edition of the championships was also held the same year at the 1980 Summer Olympics to include the IAAF-approved international women's events in 400 metres hurdles and 3000 metres which were not added to the Olympic athletics programme that year due to a dispute with the International Olympic Committee.

Track

100 m

200 m

400 m

800 m

1500 m

3000 m

5000 m

10,000 m

100 m hurdles

400 m hurdles

3000 m steeplechase

4 × 100 metres relay

4 × 400 metres relay

4 × 400 metres mixed relay

Road

Marathon

10 km walk

20 km walk

35 km walk

50 km walk

Field

High jump

Pole vault

Long jump

Triple jump

Shot put

Discus throw

Javelin throw

Hammer throw

Heptathlon

See also
List of Olympic medalists in athletics (women)
List of World Championships in Athletics medalists (men)

References

IAAF World Championships in Athletics. GBR Athletics. Retrieved on 2015-07-04.

External links
IAAF official website

World Athletics Championships
World Championships in Athletics medalists
Athletics World Championships
Women
World Championships women